The black-capped antwren (Herpsilochmus atricapillus) is a species of bird in the family Thamnophilidae. It is found in Argentina, Bolivia, Brazil, and Paraguay. Its natural habitats are subtropical or tropical dry forests and subtropical or tropical moist lowland forests.

The black-capped antwren was described by the Austrian ornithologist August von Pelzeln in 1868 and given its current binomial name Herpsilochmus atricapillus.

References

External links
Image at ADW 

black-capped antwren
Birds of Bolivia
Birds of Brazil
Birds of Paraguay
black-capped antwren
Taxonomy articles created by Polbot